Chipmunks Roasting on an Open Fire is the fourth Christmas album by Bob Rivers, and was released in 2000.

Track listing
 "The Twisted Chipmunk Song" (2:01) 
parody of "The Chipmunk Song" as performed by Alvin and the Chipmunks featuring David Seville 
 "Chipmunks Roasting on an Open Fire" (3:19)
parody of "The Christmas Song" as performed by Nat King Cole
 "The Angel"/"Who Put the Stump?" (3:27)
 parody of "Who Put the Bomp?" as performed by Barry Mann, includes a spoken-word prelude in which a father fixes a live angel tree topper for his children
 "Decorations" (2:18)
parody of "Good Vibrations" as performed by The Beach Boys
 "Carol of the Bartenders" (1:38)
A public service announcement, performed by a mostly-female a cappella quartet to the tune from "Carol of the Bells," warning against driving under the influence. (The lyrics to the Alka-Seltzer jingle, "plop plop fizz fizz," are heard in the background.)
 "Christmas Party Song" (1:43)
 parody of "It's Christmas Time" (by Victor Young and Al Stillman) as performed by The Carpenters
 "Christmas Money" (2:17)
parody of "Money (That's What I Want)" as performed by The Beatles
 "Pokémon" (1:32) 
 parody of God Rest You Merry, Gentlemen
 "Goin' Up to Bethlehem" (2:07) 
 parody of "Up Around the Bend" as performed by Creedence Clearwater Revival
 "Homeless on the Holidays" (2:52)
 parody of "Home for the Holidays" as performed by Perry Como
 "He's So Jolly" (2:04)
 parody of "Hello, Dolly!" as performed by Louis Armstrong
 "Flu Ride" (2:46)
 parody of "Sleigh Ride" as performed by The Carpenters
 "Santa Claus Is Foolin' Around" (3:22)
 parody of "Santa Claus Is Comin' to Town" as performed by Bruce Springsteen and the E Street Band
 "Stumpmaster Remix" (2:57)
 remix of "Who Put the Stump?" 

Bob Rivers albums
2000 Christmas albums
Christmas albums by American artists
2000s comedy albums